A tenso is a style of troubadour song. It takes the form of a debate in which each voice defends a position; common topics relate to love or ethics. Usually, the tenso is written by two different poets, but several examples exist in which one of the parties is imaginary, including God (Peire de Vic), the poet's horse (Gui de Cavalhon) or his cloak (Bertran Carbonel). 
Closely related, and sometimes overlapping, genres include:

 the partimen, in which more than two voices discuss a subject
 the cobla esparsa or cobla exchange, a tenso of two stanzas only
 the contenson, where the matter is eventually judged by a third party.

Notable examples
Marcabru and Uc Catola: Amics Marchabrun, car digam, possibly the earliest known example.
Cercamon and Guilhalmi: Car vei finir a tot dia, another candidate for the earliest known example.
Raimbaut d'Aurenga and Giraut de Bornelh: Ara·m platz, Giraut de Borneill, where major exponents of the two styles extol trobar clus and trobar leu, respectively.
Raimbaut de Vaqueiras: Domna tan vos ai preiada, where an (imaginary) Genoese lady answers the poet in her own dialect, is the only early document written in it.
Peire de Vic: L’autrier fui en paradis, a contrast with God
Montan: Eu veing vas vos, Seingner, fauda levada, considered the most obscene of Old Occitan lyrics.
Carenza and Iselda: Na Carenza al bel cors avenens, about whether a lady should get married, between two trobairitz.

Legacy
In Italian literature, the tenso was adapted as the tenzone. In Old French, it became the tençon. 

In the Galician-Portuguese lyric, it was called tençom.

References

Western medieval lyric forms
Occitan literary genres